Maximilian Friedrich von Königsegg-Rothenfels (13 May 1708 – 15 April 1784) was the Archbishop-Elector of Cologne and the Bishop of Münster from 1761 to 1784.

He was born in Cologne, son of Count Albert-Eusebius-Franz von Königsegg-Rothenfels and his wife Countess Maria von Manderscheid-Blankenheim. He was the first Elector of Cologne to come from outside the Bavarian Wittelsbach dynasty since 1583.

He was the first employer and patron of the young Ludwig van Beethoven, who at age twelve composed Three Early Piano Sonatas, WoO 47 in his honor. These works, known as the "Kurfürstensonaten" ("Prince-Elector sonatas") in German, were not assigned an opus number by Beethoven and are not included in the "canonical" count of 32 piano sonatas, which begins with Op. 2 No. 1 in F minor and ends with Op. 111 in C minor.

See also 
 Königsegg-Rothenfels

External links
 

1708 births
1784 deaths
Archbishop-Electors of Cologne
Prince-Bishops of Münster
18th-century Roman Catholic archbishops in the Holy Roman Empire
Cathedral deans of Cologne